The Cima dello Stagn (also known as Cima di Paina) is a mountain of the Lepontine Alps, located on the border between Italy and Switzerland. It lies between Gravedona (Lombardy) and Roveredo (Graubünden).

References

External links
 Cima dello Stagn on Hikr

Mountains of the Alps
Mountains of Switzerland
Mountains of Italy
Italy–Switzerland border
International mountains of Europe
Mountains of Graubünden
Lepontine Alps
Two-thousanders of Switzerland
Roveredo
Grono